Alastor dalyi is a species of wasp in the family Vespidae.

References

dalyi